Lethenteron zanandreai, the Lombardy lamprey, is a species of lamprey in the Petromyzontidae family. It is found in Croatia, Italy, and Slovenia. Its natural habitats are rivers and freshwater springs. It is threatened by habitat loss.

References 

zanandreai
Fish described in 1955
Fish of Europe
Taxonomy articles created by Polbot